Judge Curtis Luckey (July 31, 1904 – June 21, 1983) was an All-Southern college football tackle for the Georgia Bulldogs of the University of Georgia, known in his time as one of the best linemen in the South. He was selected on a second-team All-Time Georgia Bulldogs football team posted in 1935.

References

1904 births
1983 deaths
Georgia Bulldogs football players
Players of American football from Georgia (U.S. state)
All-Southern college football players
American football tackles